Garscadden railway station serves Garscadden in Glasgow, Scotland. The station is managed by ScotRail and lies on the Argyle Line.

History

The station here though wasn't opened until 5 November 1960 by British Railways, as part of the North Clyde Line modernisation and electrification scheme.

Services 

There are also peak-hour-only services beginning and terminating at Garscadden, mostly on the Argyle Line (via Glasgow Central Low Level). These enter service (or leave service after terminating here) from the adjacent Yoker TMD reception sidings.

Trains operate 4 x hourly (Mondays to Saturdays) from Garscadden to Glasgow City Centre, with two going to Glasgow Central Low Level and two going to Glasgow Queen Street Low Level. In the opposite direction, trains originate from either Cumbernauld or Motherwell via the Hamilton Circle line.

References

External links 

Railway stations in Glasgow
Railway stations opened by British Rail
Railway stations in Great Britain opened in 1960
SPT railway stations
Railway stations served by ScotRail